Dalian (105) is a Type 055 destroyer of the People's Liberation Army Navy. She was commissioned on 23 April 2021.

Development and design 
The People's Liberation Army Navy was interested in a large destroyer from as early as the late-1960s. A development program, code-named "055", initiated in 1976 was cancelled in 1983 after encountering insurmountable technical obstacles from industrial underdevelopment; for example, the required gas turbine power plants could neither be produced domestically, nor imported at acceptable prices. In April 2014, an image emerged of a full-scale mock-up of the Type 055 superstructure - with enclosed integrated mast for radar and other electronics at the Chinese naval electronic testing range in Wuhan.

The Type 055 is expected to undertake expeditionary missions and form the primary escort for Chinese aircraft carriers. The United States classifies these ships as cruisers.

Construction and career 
Dalian is the third ship of the class and laid down and launched on 8 July 2018 at the Dalian Shipyard in Liaoning.

References 

2018 ships
Ships built in China
Type 055 destroyers